Lahori cuisine  refers to the food and cuisine of the city of Lahore in Punjab, Pakistan. It is a part of regional Punjabi cuisine. Lahore is a city with an extremely rich food culture.  People from Lahore are famous all over the country for their love for food. The city offers a vast variety of options when it comes to gastronomy. In recent times, the style of food has achieved popularity in a  number of different countries, because of its palatable and milder taste,  mainly through the Pakistani diaspora.

Historical influences 
The arrival of Islam within South Asia influenced the local cuisine to a great degree as Muslims are forbidden to eat pork or consume alcohol along with the other enforced Islamic dietary laws. Pakistanis focus on other areas of food such as beef, lamb, chicken, fish, lentils and vegetables as well as traditional fruit and dairy. The influence of Central Asian, North Indian and Middle Eastern cuisine in Pakistani food is ubiquitous.
Much of the food of Lahore is influenced by the local Punjabi and Mughlai cuisine. Along with traditional local food, Chinese, western and foreign foods are popular throughout the city and have often been fused with local recipes to create refined tastes; Pakistani Chinese food is largely available.

Popular dishes

The following is a list of some foods of which Lahore is renowned for having unique tastes. 
 Chicken Lahori
 Gosht karahi (chicken or mutton cooked with a spicy tomato-based gravy in a concave-shaped cooking vessel that resembles a wok) is a speciality of Lahore.
 Dal gosht (meat cooked with pulses)
 Murgh Cholay/Channay (chicken cooked with chickpeas)
 Murgh Musallam (chicken cooked with rice and dry fruits stuffed inside)
 Seekh kababs (minced meat rolls)
 Gol-gappe / pani-puri
 Dahi bhallay (appetizers dipped in yoghurt)
 Shawarma/Dhawarma Platter
 Chicken tikka (barbecue-style fried chicken pieces)
 Biryani 
 Haleem 
 Falooda
 Halwa Poori - a breakfast speciality of Lahore
 Nihari
 Samosa
 Kheer
 Paya (dish)
 Lahori Fried Fish
 Chargha (Lahori-style roast chicken)
 Daal Chawal - Boiled rice with spicy lentils
 Lahori Steamed Charga
 Lahori Chana Chat
 Lahori Daal Murgh
 Lahori Red Chicken Karahi
 Hareesa - A mixture of Mutton & Lentils
 Fried fish
 Beef Bong Paaye - Beef Shank meat with foots
 Chikkarh Chollay - Water Cooked white grains in black pepper
 Naan Haleem - Baked Chapatti bread with mixture of Beef & Lentils
 Chicken pakora - chicken pieces roasted with Maida
 Chicken Sajji - Roasted & Salted Chicken on low flame in hunter style

Food streets
 Fort Road Food Street
 Gawalmandi Food Street

See also
 Pakistani cuisine
 Punjabi cuisine
 Mughlai cuisine

References

External links
 Lahori Recipes
 A Taste of Lahore: Chowk
 Real yum Street Foods of Lahore

 
Lahore